Jam Dreams is an alternative rock album recorded by American band Dr Manhattan, co-produced by Chris Conley (frontman of Saves the Day). It was released on August 18, 2009 by Cassette Deck. It was re-issued on vinyl through Have Fun Records on September 25, 2014.

Track listing
"Electraumatized" - 2:02
"Texas" - 3:06
"After All" - 4:09
"Mailman" - 4:03
"I'm High" - 2:44
"Cowgirl" - 2:38
"Misses Stewart" - 2:44
"Biscuits and Groovy" - 3:22
"Listen Up" - 0:41
"Man With a Woman's Chest" - 3:02
"Hard Time" - 2:53
"Camping Ground" - 3:34

2009 albums
Dr Manhattan (band) albums